Sladana Dokovic (born 22 July 1995) is a Swiss female handballer for LC Brühl Handball in the Spar Premium League and the Swiss national team.

Dokovic made her official debut on the Swiss national team on 1 June 2016, against Germany. She represented Switzerland for the first time at the 2022 European Women's Handball Championship in Slovenia, Montenegro and North Macedonia.

Achievements
 SPAR Premium League
Winner: 2017, 2019
 Schweizer Cupsieger
Winner: 2016, 2017
 SuperCupsieger
Winner: 2017, 2019

References

External links

1995 births
Living people
Swiss female handball players
People from St. Gallen (city)
21st-century Swiss women